"Hornblower and the Widow McCool" is a short story by C. S. Forester featuring his fictional naval hero Horatio Hornblower. It was first published in the 9 December 1950 issue of The Saturday Evening Post as "Hornblower's Temptation" and then in the UK in the April 1951 Argosy as "Hornblower and the Big Decision." It was published as "Hornblower and the Widow McCool" along with the unfinished novel Hornblower and the Crisis and the short story "The Last Encounter" in 1967, after Forester's death. The story is set after Mr. Midshipman Hornblower and before Lieutenant Hornblower.

Plot summary
The story opens in the winter of 1799–1800 when "until three months before, [Hornblower] had been a prisoner in Spanish hands."
He is the most junior of five lieutenants in the ship of the line HMS Renown. The ship has just captured a French vessel, and one of the prisoners is recognised as Irish revolutionary Barry McCool. Admiral William Cornwallis gives Hornblower the distasteful task of arranging McCool's execution for desertion from the Royal Navy.

Cornwallis insists that McCool is to make no final speech before his execution, so that he cannot try to incite mutiny among the Irish sailors in Renown'''s crew. Hornblower is unwilling to prevent McCool speaking by gagging him. However, in return for a promise by McCool not to speak before he is hanged, Hornblower agrees to send McCool's only possession, a sailor's sea chest with his name "B I McCOOL" in raised letters on the carved lid, to his widow, along with a covering letter. He is prevented from immediately doing so when Renown has to put hastily to sea after McCool is executed.

While at sea, Hornblower discerns a message hidden in an oddly clumsy poem in McCool's letter. By moving the letters of the carved name in a sequence and in a manner revealed by the poem, a secret compartment forming the lid of the chest is revealed. The compartment is stuffed with currency notes and secret correspondence to other Irish rebels, in fact "Everything one would need to start a rebellion," as Hornblower comments to himself. Hornblower, revolted at the spectacle of McCool's execution and suspecting the money could be French counterfeits, decides to spare other Irishmen from the gallows and throws the chest overboard.

Later, "when the Renown lay in the Hamoaze, completing for the West Indies," he discovers that McCool actually left no widow, and the chest was intended to reach an Irish revolutionary society. As McCool's letter said, he had remained "faithful unto death," though to the cause of Irish independence, not a woman.  Hornblower now throws McCool's final letter overboard too.  The setting of this final action links it to the opening of Lieutenant Hornblower'' which begins in mid-1800.

1950 short stories
Short stories by C. S. Forester
Horatio Hornblower
Fiction set in 1799
Historical short stories